The Pallas-1 is a medium-lift orbital launch vehicle under development by Galactic Energy. It features seven new 40-ton variable thrust Welkin engines burning RP-1 and liquid oxygen (kerolox) in its first stage. The first stage will also have legs and grid fins to allow recovery by vertical landing (much like the SpaceX Falcon 9). The first launch is scheduled to take place in 2024.

Pallas-1 is planned to be capable of placing a 5-tonne payload into low Earth orbit (LEO), or a 3-tonne payload into a 700-kilometer sun-synchronous orbit (SSO). An upgraded variant of the rocket, Pallas-2, is currently under development. Using three Pallas-1 booster cores as its first stage, Pallas-2 will be capable of putting a 14-tonne payload into low Earth orbit.

References

Space launch vehicles of China
VTVL rockets
Proposed reusable launch systems